Greenfield Hall is located in Haddonfield, Camden County, New Jersey, United States. The building was built in 1747 and added to the National Register of Historic Places on June 5, 1974. The Historical Society of Haddonfield operates a museum within the building.

History
The first structure to be built on the property was a small cabin built in 1728 by John Gill Sr. This cabin was later torn down. John Gill Sr.'s son John Gill Jr. built a new house on the property in 1747. In 1841, this house was torn down with the exception of two small rooms and a new house was built in its place. The new house was built by John Gill IV and is a red brick, center-hall -story Georgian-style home. Alexander Oswald Brodie purchased the home in 1916 and lived there until his death two years later. The house then passed through a succession of owners until 1960 when it became the headquarters of the Historical Society of Haddonfield.

The museum
The museum has three rooms, a parlor, dining room and bedroom, which are kept as they would have appeared in 1841. The other rooms are used to show various items from the Historical Society's large collections relating to the history of Haddonfield.

See also
National Register of Historic Places listings in Camden County, New Jersey
List of museums in New Jersey

References

External links

 Greenfield Hall - Historical Society of Haddonfield

Haddonfield, New Jersey
Houses on the National Register of Historic Places in New Jersey
Houses in Camden County, New Jersey
Houses completed in 1747
Museums in Camden County, New Jersey
History museums in New Jersey
National Register of Historic Places in Camden County, New Jersey
1747 establishments in New Jersey
New Jersey Register of Historic Places